The 1895–96 season was the thirteenth to be played by the team now known as Bristol Rovers, and their twelfth playing under the name Eastville Rovers. The first team played their fourth campaign in division one of the Western League (known in previous seasons as the Bristol & District League), while the reserves competed in the second division of the same competition for the third time. The season was notable for Rovers having entered the FA Cup for the first time in their history, and for the first team playing their 100th competitive match.

The senior squad finished the season as joint runners-up of the Western League first division after tying for second place in the table with Staple Hill and a playoff match to separate them ended in a draw, while the reserves ended their campaign in fifth place in division two. The first team were also runners-up in the Gloucestershire Senior Cup, losing out in the final to long-time rivals Warmley, but the campaign was marred by the death of an opposing player in their semi-final with Bedminster following a clash of heads.

The club's début in the FA Cup came in the preliminary round and ended in a 2–0 defeat, again to Warmley.

Season review 
The 1895–96 season began with the news that Lewis John had been appointed as the new club captain, replacing H. McBain who had been skipper the previous year.

Rovers started the season strongly, winning eight of their first nine games, although one of those victories was later expunged from the record after Cardiff were expelled from the league. Their form trailed off slightly after that, but they ended the season well enough to finish joint second place in the table. The Western League had decided that goal average would no longer be used to split teams tied on points and that a test match would be held to decide the finishing order. A match was duly arranged between Rovers and Staple Hill to determine who would be runners-up, but the game ended in a 2–2 draw, leading to the teams being named joint runners-up.

League tables

Western League Division One

Western League Division Two

Match results

Western League

Division One

Division Two 

The results of the away match against Bedminster Reserves and the remaining game against Cumberland are not known.

FA Cup 

The lineups for Eastville Rovers' first ever game in the FA Cup (referred to at the time as the English Cup) is shown below.
GK = Goalkeeper, C = Captain

Gloucestershire Senior Challenge Cup 
Rovers were runners-up in the Gloucestershire Senior Cup this season, losing out to Warmley in the final which was watched by around 6000 spectators – believed to have been a record attendance for the area at the time. They were narrowly beaten by a single goal to nil by the Warmleyites in a re-match of the 1889 final which Rovers had won by the same scoreline.

Their semi-final victory was marred by the death of Bedminster outside-right Herbert Edward "Teddy" Smith. He was involved in a clash of heads with Rovers' fullback Lovett during the first half when both were attempting to head the ball, Smith receiving a heavy blow to the side of his head. Both men continued playing after initially falling to the ground. When the game resumed for the second half Smith was late re-joining his teammates and play went on without him. When he eventually made it back onto the field he was reported as appearing pale and confused and unable to participate in any meaningful way. A few minutes later he was forced to leave the match after vomiting and was taken to his parents' house in Southville where he lost consciousness in the evening and died early the following morning.

Friendlies

Notes

Statistics 
Friendly matches are not included in this section.

Cumulative record 
The total cumulative record of Eastville Rovers up to the end of the 1895–96 season is shown below. This is calculated by adding the numbers in the section above to the total games played up to the end of the previous season. Friendly matches are not included in this table, and games held at neutral venues are considered to have been played away from home.

References 

Bristol Rovers F.C. seasons
Eastville Rovers